James Fifer (July 14, 1930 – June 7, 1986) was an American former competition rower and Olympic champion. He won the gold medal in coxless pair with Duvall Hecht at the 1956 Summer Olympics in Melbourne.

References

1930 births
1986 deaths
Olympic gold medalists for the United States in rowing
Rowers at the 1952 Summer Olympics
Rowers at the 1956 Summer Olympics
Stanford Cardinal rowers
American male rowers
Medalists at the 1956 Summer Olympics